The Jamaica Star is a newspaper often cited as a resource for happenings in Jamaica.

According to an advertisement in Editor & Publisher in 1965, the Star was one of the first papers to carry the King Features Syndicate's coloring and comics page for children.

References 

Official website: http://jamaica-star.com/

Newspapers published in Jamaica